Vittalpadanur  is a village in the southern state of Karnataka, India. It is located in the Bantwal taluk of Dakshina Kannada district.

Demographics
 India census, Vittalpadanur had a population of 6221 with 3070 males and 3151 females.

See also
 Dakshina Kannada
 Districts of Karnataka

References

External links
 http://dk.nic.in/

Villages in Dakshina Kannada district